Peopled with Dreams is the seventh studio album by American Christian singer and songwriter John Mark McMillan, released on February 14, 2020, through Lionhawk Records. The album includes singles "The Road, the Rocks, and the Weeds", "Bright Abyss", "Juggernaut", and "Pilgrim".

Background and recording 
Peopled with Dreams was produced by Jacob Early and John Mark McMillan and recorded at Hawk's Den Studio in Charlotte, NC. The album was mixed by Chad Howat and mastered by Jonathan Berlin.

Promotion 
While McMillan typically would have toured the album soon after its release, he was unable to embark on the Awake in the Dream Tour until late 2021 due to the COVID-19 pandemic. The tour stopped at various locations across the United States, and McMillan was joined on tour by Strahan, The Gray Havens, and Antoine Bradford.

Commercial performance and critical reception 
Peopled with Dreams peaked at No. 47 on Billboard}s Top Christian Albums chart, but did not chart outside the Christian genre like his previous release. The album was received well by reviewing critics, though it received little critical attention.

Track listing

References 

2020 albums
John Mark McMillan albums